The 2017 WAC men's soccer tournament was the 10th edition of the tournament. It determined the Western Athletic Conference's automatic berth into the 2017 NCAA Division I Men's Soccer Championship. The defending champions were the UNLV Rebels.

Seattle U won their third WAC title, defeating San Jose State, 2-1 in the championship game. With the win, Seattle U surpassed UNLV and Fresno State with the most WAC Tournament titles. With the berth, Seattle U earned an automatic bid into the NCAA Tournament. There, they upset city-rivals, Washington, in the first round, before falling to Akron in the second round.

Seeding 

The top seven teams will qualify for the tournament.

Bracket

Schedule

First Round

Semifinals

Final

References 

Western Athletic Conference Men's Soccer
2017